Pasar Minggu Baru Station (PSMB) is a railway station in East Pejaten, Pasar Minggu, South Jakarta, Indonesia. The station, which is located at an altitude of + 29 metres, is included in the Jakarta Operational Area I and only serves the KRL Commuterline route.

Since 8 September 2021, this station and Universitas Pancasila Station [id] already have a pedestrian tunnel, which facilitates access for passenger crossing, as well as being equipped with an elevator located in the middle of both sides of the platform.

Building and layout 
This station has two railway tracks.

Services
The following is a list of train services at the Pasar Minggu Baru Station

Passenger services 
 KAI Commuter

Supporting transportation

References

External links

South Jakarta
Railway stations in Jakarta